USS Nantahala has been the name of more than one United States Navy ship, and may refer to:

 , a cargo ship in commission from 1918 to 1919
 , an oiler in commission from 1944 to June 1950 and from December 1950 to 1973

United States Navy ship names